Dow 36,000: The New Strategy for Profiting From the Coming Rise in the Stock Market is a 1999 book by syndicated columnist James K. Glassman and economist Kevin A. Hassett, in which they argued that stocks in 1999 were significantly undervalued and concluded that there would be a fourfold market increase with the Dow Jones Industrial Average (DJIA) rising to 36,000 by 2002 or 2004. The bursting of the dot-com bubble of 2000, September 11 attacks in 2001, and the Financial crisis of 2007–2008 ensured that the titular target would not be attained within the author's suggested timeframe. It wasn't until 2021 when Dow 36,000 would be reached in actuality, 22 years after the book was published.

Context
Glassman and Hassett had predicted that the

The book was published in 1999, shortly before the dot-com bubble burst, and predicted that stocks would rise quickly to 36,000. Although the DJIA reached a record high of 11,750.28 in January 2000, it fell steadily after the bursting of the dot-com bubble. Following the September 11 attacks of 2001, the DJIA fell further, reaching a low of 7,286.27 in October 2002. Although the DJIA recovered to a new record high of 14,164.53 in October 2007, it crashed back to the vicinity of 6,500 by the early months of 2009, amidst a global recession.

Historical results
Excerpts from the book were published in The Atlantic Monthly in 1999. In the January 2000 issue of The Atlantic Monthly, Glassman and Hassett replied to a critic of their theory that "if the Dow is closer to 10,000 than to 36,000 ten years from now, we will each give $1,000 to the charity of your choice." For the Dow to be closer to 10,000 than to 36,000, it would have to be below 23,000.  As things turned out, the index was not even at half that figure ten years after Glassman and Hassett's prediction (the Dow's highest close in January 2010 was 10,725, reached on January 19). In early 2010, Glassman and Hassett conceded they lost the bet and they each donated $1,000 to the Salvation Army. It wasn't until October 18, 2017, coincidentally the day before the 30th anniversary of Black Monday, that the Dow closed above 23,000, thus finally reaching more than halfway from 10,000 to 36,000. Following multiple downturns, including the 2020 stock market crash, the Dow continued rising toward the titular milestone. The Dow Jones Industrial Average finally reached 36,000 in intraday trading on November 1, 2021 and closed above it the next day.

Summary of main argument
According to John Quiggin, writing in the Australian Financial Review, Glassman and Hassett believed that both investors and official commentators had mistakenly considered stocks to be a risky investment which should require a premium return, when compared to 'safe' investments such as government bonds. They argued that if stocks and bonds were treated as equally risky, the Dow Jones index would be around 36,000. Hence, anyone who gets in now and stays for the long haul, can expect returns of around 300 per cent (in addition to the normal interest rate) as the rest of the market wakes up. Once this historic correction is over, the efficient-market hypothesis will hold sway.

Quiggin situated Glassman and Hassett at a time when the economic boom in the United States of the 1990s had created "the renascence of the stock market"—the Dow Jones index had risen from 1000 in the early 1980s to more than 10,000 by 2000 with Nasdaq, a technology-based-index with an even more dramatic rise.

References

External links
 Booknotes interview with Glassman on Dow 36,000 3 October 3, 1999.

1999 non-fiction books
American non-fiction books
Collaborative non-fiction books
Dow Jones Industrial Average
Finance books
Prediction